Carlos Luis Jesús Vizcarrondo Irizarry (born November 9, 1955 in San Juan, Puerto Rico) is a Puerto Rican politician, judge, and former representative. He is affiliated with the Popular Democratic Party (PPD). Vizcarrondo served at the Puerto Rico House of Representatives from 1995 to 2005, and served as Speaker of the House during his last term (2001–2005). He served as a judge at the Puerto Rico Court of Appeals.

Biography

Carlos Luis Jesús Vizcarrondo Irizarry was born on November 9, 1955 in San Juan, Puerto Rico. His parents were Luis Héctor Vizcarrondo Wolf and Sonia Irizarry Boada. Vizcarrondo has a brother (Luis Héctor) and a sister (Sonia Margarita).

Vizcarrondo, who is an attorney, began his career working at the Legal Services Office in Canóvanas, Puerto Rico, first as Deputy Director (1982–1993) and then as Director (1993–1995).

Vizcarrondo's political career began from 1985 to 1988, when he was Vice-president of the Municipal Assembly of Carolina, Puerto Rico. In 1995, he joined the Puerto Rico House of Representatives. He was elected officially in 1996. He was again reelected at the 2000 general elections and was appointed as Speaker of the House. He served as such until 2005.

Vizcarrondo is also a member of the Puerto Rico Bar Association, and was a member of the Constitutional Rights Committee in it. From 1986 to 1988, he also served as Vice-president of the Association.

See also

List of Puerto Ricans

References

External links
Carlos Vizcarrondo on La Red Biografíca de Puerto Rico

1955 births
Speakers of the House of Representatives of Puerto Rico
Living people
Puerto Rican judges
Popular Democratic Party members of the House of Representatives of Puerto Rico
People from Santurce, Puerto Rico